Bedellia cathareuta is a moth of the  family Bedelliidae. It is known from South Africa.

References

Endemic moths of South Africa
Bedelliidae
Moths of Africa